Viola Irene Desmond (July 6, 1914 – February 7, 1965) was a Canadian civil and women's rights activist and businesswoman of Black Nova Scotian descent. In 1946, she challenged racial segregation at a cinema in New Glasgow, Nova Scotia, by refusing to leave a whites-only area of the Roseland Theatre. For this, she was convicted of a minor tax violation for the one-cent tax difference between the seat that she had paid for and the seat that she used, which was more expensive. Desmond's case is one of the most publicized incidents of racial discrimination in Canadian history and helped start the modern civil rights movement in Canada.

In 2010, Desmond was granted a posthumous free pardon, the first to be granted in Canada. A free pardon deems the person granted the pardon to have never committed the offence and cancels any consequence resulting from the conviction, such as fines, prohibitions or forfeitures. However, it was not until 2021 that the government repaid the $26 (now $324 CAD as of 2023) fine to her estate in the form of a $1,000 scholarship that adjusted the amount to reflect the time value of money. The Crown-in-Right-of-Nova Scotia also apologized for prosecuting her for tax evasion and acknowledged she was rightfully resisting racial discrimination. In 2016, the Bank of Canada inaccurately announced that Desmond would be the first Canadian woman to be featured on the front of a Canadian banknote, but that honour went to Agnes Macphail, who appeared along with three men on a small print run commemorative note issued in 2017 to mark the 150th anniversary of Confederation.

In late 2018, Desmond became the second Canadian woman, after Queen Elizabeth II, to appear alone on a Canadian bank note—a $10 bill—which was unveiled by Finance Minister Bill Morneau and Bank of Canada Governor Stephen Poloz during a ceremony at the Halifax Central Library on March 8, 2018. Desmond was also named a National Historic Person in 2018.

Biography
Viola Desmond was born on July 6, 1914, one of ten children of James Albert and Gwendolin Irene (née Johnson) Davis. Viola was raised by her father and mother in Halifax. Viola's father worked as a stevedore for a number of years before he became a barber.

Growing up, Desmond noted the absence of professional hair and skin-care products for black women and set her sights on addressing this need. Being of African descent, she was not allowed to train to become a beautician in Halifax, so she left and received beautician training in Montreal, Atlantic City, and one of Madam C. J. Walker's beauty schools in New York. Upon finishing her training, Desmond returned to Halifax to start her own hair salon called Vi's Studio of Beauty Culture. Her clients included Portia White and Gwen Jenkins, later the first black nurse in Nova Scotia.

In addition to the salon, Desmond opened The Desmond School of Beauty Culture so that black women would not have to travel as far as they had to receive proper training. Catering to women from Nova Scotia, New Brunswick and Quebec, the school operated using a vertical integration framework. Students were provided with the skills required to open their own businesses and provide jobs for other black women within their communities. Each year as many as fifteen women graduated from the school, all of whom had been denied admission to whites-only training schools. Desmond also started her own line of beauty products, Vi's Beauty Products, which she marketed and sold herself.

Arrest
Viola Desmond joined her husband Jack Desmond in a combined barbershop and hairdressing salon on  Street. On November 8, 1946 while on a business trip to Sydney to sell her beauty products, Viola Desmond's car broke down in New Glasgow. She was told that she would have to wait a day before the parts to fix it became available. To pass the time while waiting, she went to see  The Dark Mirror starring Olivia de Havilland at the Roseland Film Theatre.

There were no segregation laws for movie theatres in Nova Scotia, and the theatre had no sign telling its patrons about the policy, but main floor seats were reserved for white patrons, a discriminatory practice permitted in all Canadian provinces. Desmond was sold a ticket to the balcony. Unaware of the segregation and, being nearsighted, she went to sit in the floor section to be close to the screen. When she was asked to move, she realized what was happening, and refused to move because she had a better view from the main floor. When she requested to exchange her balcony ticket to the main floor for an additional cost, she was refused and forcefully removed from the theatre which caused an injury to her hip. She was also arrested and spent 12 hours in jail, and had to pay a $26 fine for tax evasion. The tax on the balcony price of 30 cents was two cents; the tax on the floor price of 40 cents was three cents. She was convicted of depriving the government of one cent in tax. Desmond was kept in jail overnight and was never informed about her right to legal advice, a lawyer, or bail.

Upon returning to Halifax, Desmond discussed the matter with her husband, and his advice was to let it go. However, she then sought advice from the leaders of her church, the Cornwallis Street Baptist Church, where the Minister William Pearly Oliver and his wife Pearline encouraged her to take action. With their support, Desmond decided to fight the charge in court.

Trials
Following the decision to fight the charge, Carrie Best broke the story of Desmond in the first edition of The Clarion, the first black-owned and published Nova Scotia newspaper. Best closely covered the story of Desmond on front page as she had herself previously confronted the racial segregation of the Roseland Theatre.

With the help of her church and the Nova Scotia Association for the Advancement of Coloured People (NSAACP), Desmond hired a lawyer, Frederick William Bissett, who represented her in the criminal trials and attempted, unsuccessfully, to file a lawsuit against the Roseland Theatre.

During subsequent trials the government insisted on arguing that this was a case of tax evasion. A provincial act regulating cinemas and movie theatres required the payment of an amusement tax based on the price of the theatre ticket. Since the theatre would only agree to sell Desmond a cheaper balcony ticket, but she had insisted upon sitting in the much more expensive main floor seat, she was only one cent short on tax. The statute used to convict Desmond contained no explicitly racist or discriminatory language.

Bissett's decision to opt for a judicial review rather than appeal the original conviction proved disastrous. Desmond's lawyer tried to appeal the decision on the basis of her being wrongfully accused of tax evasion, not on the basis of racial discrimination. When dismissing the case, Justice William Lorimer Hall said:

Her lawyer, Bissett, refused to bill Desmond, and the money was used to support William Pearly Oliver's newly established NSAACP.

Later life
After the trial and encounter with the legal system of Nova Scotia, her marriage ended. Desmond closed her business and moved to Montreal where she could enroll in a business college. She eventually settled in New York City, where she died from gastrointestinal bleeding on February 7, 1965, at the age of 50. She is buried at Camp Hill Cemetery in Halifax, Nova Scotia.

Legacy

William Pearly Oliver later reflected on Desmond's legacy:

Desmond is often compared to Rosa Parks, given they both challenged racism by refusing to vacate seats in "Whites Only" sections and contributed to the rise of the Civil Rights Movement. Despite Nova Scotia and other Canadian provinces having Jim Crow laws, for instance in education, there was no law specifically enforcing segregation in theaters.

Commemorations 

On 28 January 2019, Temma Frecker, a Nova Scotia teacher at The Booker School, was awarded the Governor General's History Award for her class' proposal to build a statue of Desmond in Cornwallis Park.  Her proposal was to include the existing Edward Cornwallis statue among three other statues of Acadian Noël Doiron, Black Nova Scotian Viola Desmond and Mi'kmaq Chief John Denny Jr.  The four statutes would be positioned as if in a conversation with each other, discussing their accomplishments and struggles.

Cape Breton University established a scholarship campaign in the names of Viola Desmond and her sister Wanda Robson, and named a Chair in Social Justice after Desmond.

In 2010, Mayann E. Francis Lieutenant Governor of Nova Scotia unveiled a portrait of Desmond which is on permanent display in the Ballroom at Government House (Nova Scotia).

In 2012, Desmond was portrayed on a commemorative stamp issued by Canada Post.

On July 7, 2016, a Halifax harbour ferry was launched bearing her name.

On December 8, 2016, Viola Desmond was chosen as the first Canadian-born woman; the second woman, after Queen Elizabeth II; and the first black person and non-royal to appear on her own on a Canadian banknote. After being on a shortlist of five, Desmond was featured on the Canadian ten-dollar bill. On November 26, 2018, the Bank of Canada released a new design of the $10 bill, celebrating Viola Desmond's achievements in the civil rights movement. The back of the ten-dollar note featured a map of Halifax's historic north end, along with the Canadian Museum for Human Rights in Winnipeg, Manitoba.

Desmond was named a National Historic Person on January 12, 2018.

In June 2018, Canada's Walk of Fame star was unveiled at the Halifax Ferry Terminal.

In June 2018, at the request of a local city councillor, Scarborough community council approved the renaming of Hupfield Park as Viola Desmond Park. The park is located in the Malvern neighbourhood of Scarborough within Toronto.

In July 2018, a short stretch of Forbes Street in New Glasgow outside of the former Roseland Theatre was renamed Viola's Way.

In February 2019, Royal Canadian Mint announced the release of first Black History Month coin, a pure silver coin featuring Viola Desmond.

In April 2019, the International Bank Note Society (IBNS) selected Canadian ten-dollar note featuring Viola Desmond to receive Bank Note of the Year Award for 2018.

In April 2021, the Hamilton-Wentworth District School Board announced a new elementary school named after Desmond. The Viola Desmond Elementary School educates 682 students in kindergarten through to Grade 8 and opened in September 2021.

In November 2022, the Toronto International Film Festival announced that the largest screening room at the TIFF Bell Lightbox will be named the Viola Desmond Theatre in 2023.

The Arts 
In 2000, Desmond and other Canadian civil rights activists were the subject of a National Film Board of Canada documentary Journey to Justice.   A documentary film was made about her, entitled Long Road to Justice: The Viola Desmond Story.

Her sister, Wanda Robson (1926-2022), wrote a book about activism in her family and her experiences with her sister, titled Sister to Courage. Desmond was also the subject of a children's book Viola Desmond Won't Be Budged by Jody Nyasha Warner.

Singer Faith Nolan wrote a song about her.

On February 2, 2016, Historica Canada featured Desmond in a Heritage Minute, filmed in High River, Alberta, in June 2015. The video features Kandyse McClure as Viola Desmond. She became the first historical woman of colour to feature in a Heritage Minute.

Google's July 6, 2018 Doodle, created by Google artist Sophie Diao, celebrates the life and legacy of Viola Desmond, and was distributed across Canada.

Desmond's life and broader issues of racial discrimination in Canada are the subject of a play developed by Toronto playwright Andrea Scott. Controlled Damage was produced by Halifax's Neptune Theatre in association with b current productions of Toronto. The play premiered at Neptune on 4 February 2020 with Halifax actress Deborah Castrilli in the role of Viola Desmond.

Apology and pardon
On April 14, 2010, the Lieutenant Governor of Nova Scotia, Mayann Francis, on the advice of Premier Darrell Dexter, invoked the Royal Prerogative and granted Desmond a posthumous free pardon, the first to be granted in Canada. The free pardon, an extraordinary remedy granted under the Royal Prerogative of Mercy only in the rarest of circumstances and the first one granted posthumously, differs from a simple pardon in that it is based on innocence and recognizes that a conviction was in error. Francis, herself a Black Canadian, remarked: "Here I am, 64 years later – a black woman giving freedom to another black woman", about her signing of the pardon.

The Government of Nova Scotia also apologized. Desmond's younger sister Wanda Robson and Graham Reynolds, a professor of Cape Breton University, worked with the Government of Nova Scotia to ensure that Desmond's name was cleared, there was a public acknowledgement of the injustice and Nova Scotia reaffirmed its commitment to Human Rights.  The provincial government declared the first Nova Scotia Heritage Day in her honour in February 2015.  Desmond's portrait also hangs in Government House in Halifax, Nova Scotia.

In 2021, prompted by a request from Ontario high school student Varishini Deochand, the Government of Nova Scotia offered a symbolic repayment of Desmond's original court fees to her only surviving family member, Robson. When Robson said she would use the money to make a one-time donation for a scholarship at Cape Breton University, the Province increased the repayment from the current valuation of $368.29 to $1,000. The province also issued a commemorative cheque to display in its legislature. Original court costs were $26.

See also
 Black Nova Scotians
 Charles Daniels (activist)
 Cornwallis Street Baptist Church
 Joan Jones

References

Bibliography

Further reading
 The King v Desmond (1947), 20 MPR 297 (NS SC), at 299–301.
 Obituary in the Halifax Chronicle-Herald, February 10, 1965, p. 26
 Constance Backhouse.  Racial Segregation in Canadian Legal History: Viola Desmond's challenge, Nova Scotia, 1946

External links

 
 Viola Desmond, biography
 Viola Desmond is not Canada’s Rosa Parks
 Virtual Archives: Viola Irene Desmond — 2015 Honouree, Nova Scotia Heritage Day
 NFB: Journey to Justice, featuring Viola Desmond

Canadian Baptists
Canadian civil rights activists
Women civil rights activists
Canadian expatriates in the United States
Recipients of Canadian royal pardons
Black Nova Scotians
History of Black people in Canada
People from Halifax, Nova Scotia
1914 births
1965 deaths
Beauticians
Businesspeople from Nova Scotia
Deaths from gastrointestinal hemorrhage
School founders
Women founders
20th-century Canadian businesswomen
20th-century Canadian businesspeople
Black Canadian women
Black Canadian businesspeople
Canadian women activists
People who have received posthumous pardons
Persons of National Historic Significance (Canada)
20th-century Baptists
20th-century philanthropists
20th-century Canadian women
Black Canadian activists
Tax evasion